Beta Chamaeleontis, Latinized from β Chamaeleontis,  is the third-brightest star in the southern constellation of Chamaeleon. A solitary, suspected variable star, it is visible to the naked eye as a faint blue-white point of light with an apparent visual magnitude that has been measured ranging between 4.24 and 4.30. Parallax measurements yield a distance estimate of 298 light years from the Sun, and it is drifting further away with a radial velocity of +23 km/s.

This is a B-type main-sequence star with a stellar classification of B4 V that is generating energy through core hydrogen fusion. It has been catalogued both as a Be star and a normal star. This object is about 23 million years old with a high projected rotational velocity of 255 km/s. The rapid rotation is creating an equatorial bulge that is 12% larger than the polar radius. The star has five times the mass of the Sun and 2.8 times the Sun's radius. It is radiating 212 times the luminosity of the Sun from its photosphere at an effective temperature of 14,495 K.

References

B-type main-sequence stars
Be stars

Chamaeleon (constellation)
Chamaeleontis, Beta
CD-78 00495
106911
060000
4674